Japalura sagittifera, the Burmese japalure , is a species of agamid lizard. It is endemic to Myanmar.

References

Japalura
Reptiles of Myanmar
Reptiles described in 1940
Taxa named by Malcolm Arthur Smith